Colin Elgie is an English illustrator and former member of Hipgnosis. He has worked with progressive rock bands and musicians such as Pink Floyd, The Hollies, Black Sabbath, Led Zeppelin, Renaissance, Genesis, Fumble, Peter Gabriel, Roger Cook, Al Stewart, and Roger Taylor.

Elgie's clients consisted primarily of Cambridge, England, natives and Hipgnosis members Aubrey Powell, and later Peter Christopherson, as well as Storm Thorgerson and David Gilmour.

History 
In 1971, Elgie met Thorgerson and Powell for the first time. He began his work by illustrating three albums for The Hollies: Distant Light and Romany in 1972, and Out on the Road in 1973. In the same year he also worked on the album A Nice Pair together with David Gilmour and Roger Waters of Pink Floyd. In 1974, Elgie and Powell illustrated covers of Thunderbox, and Fumble's album Poetry In Lotion.

In the 1970s, Elgie illustrated the covers for Strife's album Rush (1975), Genesis' album A Trick of the Tail (1976), and in 1977, for 10cc's album Deceptive Bends and Songwriter by Justin Hayward. In 1978, he met Jon Anderson of Yes and created the covers for their album Tormato, on which Jon sang 'Don't Kill the Whale'. In the same year, he illustrated Peter Gabriel's new album Scratch. In 1981, he created the album cover for James Ingram's Zingara.

Discography 

Compilations:

Hot 'N' Nasty: The Anthology
Black Box: The Complete Original Black Sabbath 1970–1978
Sense Of Direction
1976–1982
Back To Back: Sense Of Direction / Stamp Album (2xCD, Comp + Box)
The Lot
The Ten Year War (Box, Comp, Ltd, Num, RM, Art + LP, Album, RE, RM)
The A&M Vinyl Box-Set 1970–1975 (9xLP, Album, RE, RM + Box, Comp, Ltd)

References 

English graphic designers
Design writers
Album-cover and concert-poster artists
Pink Floyd
Genesis (band)
Peter Gabriel
Artists from Cambridge
Living people
Year of birth missing (living people)